The Wonder Years is the fourth studio album by American record producer 9th Wonder. It was released on September 27, 2011 through his own label It's a Wonderful World Music Group. Recording sessions took place at Khrysis' Crib, at the Peanut Gallery in Raleigh, North Carolina, at Brightlady Studios, and at Record Plant in Los Angeles. Production was handled entirely by 9th Wonder himself, who also served as executive producer. It features guest appearances from Terrace Martin, Median, Phonte, Actual Proof, Big Remo, Bird & The Midnight Falcons, Blu, Erykah Badu, Fashawn, GQ, Halo, Heather Victoria, Holly Weerd, Kendrick Lamar, Khrysis, King Mez, Mac Miller, Marsha Ambrosius, Masta Killa, MeLa Machinko, Murs, Problem, Raekwon, Rapsody, Skyzoo, Talib Kweli, Tanya Morgan, Thee Tom Hardy and Warren G. The album peaked at number 76 on the Billboard 200 in the United States.

Overview
It was originally scheduled to be released in 2008 through Asylum Records but it was delayed to undisclosed reasons. The songs originally recorded for the album were leaked such as "Star" featuring his former group Little Brother, "Ms. Diva" featuring Tyler Woods and Talib Kweli and "Only Knew" featuring Tyler Woods and Styles P.

Track listing

Standard edition

iTunes deluxe edition
 "Make It Big (Remix)" featuring Big Remo & Kryhsis
 "Band Practice Pt. 2" featuring Phonte and Median
 "Enjoy (West Coastin')" featuring Warren G, Murs and Kendrick Lamar
 "Streets of Music" featuring Tanya Morgan and Enigma of Actual Proof
 "Hearing the Melody" featuring Fashawn, King Mez and  Skyzoo
 "Loyalty" featuring Masta Killa and Halo
 "Now I'm Being Cool" featuring MeLa Machinko and King Mez
 "Never Stop Loving You" featuring Terrace Martin and Talib Kweli
 "Piranhas" featuring Blu and Sundown of Actual Proof
 "Peanut Butter & Jelly" featuring Marsha Ambrosius
 "One Night" featuring Terrace Martin, Phonte, and Bird and The Midnight Falcons
 "Your Smile" featuring Holly Weerd and Thee Tom Hardy
 "No Pretending" featuring Raekwon and Big Remo
 "20 Feet Tall (Remix)" featuring Erykah Badu and Rapsody
 "That's Love" featuring Mac Miller and Heather Victoria
 "A Star U R" featuring  GQ, Terrace Martin, & Problem 
 "Band Practice" featuring Phonte
 "Me and My Nuh" featuring Teedra Moses
 "Base For Your Face" featuring Lil B, Jean Grae and Phonte

Charts

References

External links

2011 albums
9th Wonder albums
Albums produced by 9th Wonder